Alfred Acur Okodi (born 25 December 1954)  is an Anglican bishop who presided over the Diocese of West Lango from 2014 to 2018 in Uganda.

Okodi was born in Alebtong District and was educated at Uganda Christian University. He was ordained in 1991. He has served as Vicar of St. Stephen, Nsambya; Archdeacon of Kampala South; Sub Dean of All Saints' Cathedral, Kampala and Kampala Diocesan Mission Coordinator.

References

Anglican bishops of West Lango
21st-century Anglican bishops in Uganda
Anglican archdeacons in Africa
Living people
Uganda Christian University alumni
1954 births
People from Alebtong District